The Sidon District is a district within the South Governorate of Lebanon.

Cities and towns
Aadloun
Ansariye
Ghaziyeh
Maghdouché
Majdelyoun
Miye ou Miye
Qinarit
Salhieh
Sarepta
Sidon - capital
Tabbaya
Zrarieh
Kawthariyat al-Sayyad

Villages 
Ain El Delb
Anqoun
Darb Es Sim
Hajjeh
Kfar Chellal
Kfar Hatta
Qraiye
Tanbourit
Zaita
Zaghdraiya

Oil and petroleum
The pipeline played an important role in the global trade of petroleum—helping with the economic development of Lebanon—as well as American and Middle Eastern political relations. After the 1967 Six-Day War and due to constant bickering between Saudi Arabia and Syria and Lebanon over transit fees, the emergence of oil supertankers and pipeline breakdowns, the section of the line beyond Jordan ceased operation in 1976.

The city of Sidon is the site of a large-scale oil facility constituting oil-storage tanks, an oil refinery, a thermal power plant and a fuel port. During the Lebanese civil war and the Israeli invasions, the site was bombarded several times either by Israeli war-planes or by Palestinian militia groups which lead eventually to the closure of the site. The oil tank and the refinery are in severe conditions but are now undergoing a massive rehabilitation plan put down by the Ministry of Power and Water Resources, as well as those in Tripoli in the north, to store Lebanon's future oil and natural gas supplies recently discovered offshore. For now, the facilities that still work on the site are the thermal power plant and the fuel port, which the state began to use to import oil after the pipeline ceased work in the 1970s.

Demographics 

According to voter registration data, voters in the district are mostly Muslim (83%).

Voters in the city of Saida (61237) are 94% Muslim:

 84% are Sunni
 9% are Shia
 6% are Christian (mixed between Maronite, Greek Melkite Catholic, and Armenian Orthodox).

Voters in the rest of the district (112372, called the Zahrani constituency in the 2018 electoral law) are predominantly Shia and 77% Muslim:

 74% are Shia
 3% are Sunni
 12% are Greek Melkite Catholic
 10% are Maronite

Thus, there is a bigger percentage of Christian voters in the district of Saida (17%) than in Tyre (6.3%), but much less than in Jezzine (75%).

References

 
Districts of Lebanon